Lower Penarth Halt was a station on the now completely removed double track branch from Penarth to Biglis Junction, Cadoxton in Glamorgan, South Wales.

The station opened in 1888. It had two platforms, with shelters on each, and a substantial waiting room on the 'up' platform. It had no footbridge, though a level crossing was supplied.

The Great Western Railway downgraded the station to a halt in 1935, a fate shared by most other stations on the branch. It closed in 1954, fourteen years before the rest of the branch. The platform and waiting room had been completely removed to ground level prior to 1966, and the site to the west (former up line side) is now occupied by bungalows, some of the trackbed having been sold off to private homeowners. The trackbed from just south of Lower Penarth to Penarth town centre is now a railway walk. )

References

Former Taff Vale Railway stations
Disused railway stations in the Vale of Glamorgan
Railway stations in Great Britain opened in 1888
Railway stations in Great Britain closed in 1954